Poch, Pochen or Pochspiel is a very old card game that is considered one of the forerunners of poker, a game that developed in America in the 19th century. An etymological relationship between the game names is also assumed. Games related to Poch are the French Glic and Nain Jaune and the English Pope Joan. Other forerunners of poker and possible relatives of the game are the English game, Brag, from the 16th century and the French Brelan (later Bouillotte) and Belle, Flux et Trente-et-Un. Poch is recorded as early as 1441 in Strasbourg.

Pochen is also another name for the card game Tippen or Dreiblatt.

Rules 
The rules reproduced below are based on the description in Meyer (1908),  supplemented by Von Alvensleben (1853). Poch was and is played in many variations with different details; the rules given here are not universal or binding like the rules of chess.

General 
Poch is a game of chance for 3 to 6 people. If 3 or 4 play, a pack of 32 French playing cards or German cards is used. If 5 or 6 play, a pack of 52 French playing cards is recommended. Also needed is a Poch board (Pochbrett) with 9 compartments or 'pools' into which are placed stakes for the Ace, King, Queen, Jack, Ten, Mariage, Sequence and Poch. Dealing and play are clockwise.

Before the start of the game, the board is 'dressed' in that each player antes one chip to each pool on the board except the one in the middle, the Pinke (pronounced "pinker"). The dealer shuffles the cards, offers to his right for cutting, deals five cards (3 +2 or 2 + 3) to each player and finally turns the top card of the talon to determine the trump suit (Atout).

Stage One: Melding 
After the cards are dealt, the players move to the first stage of the game, melding (Melden or Ansagen), where they declare their 'figures' (Figuren). For example, if a player has the Ace of Trumps, he reveals it and collects the amount in the relevant pool of the board. Players with the King of Trumps, Queen of Trumps, Jack of Trumps, and Ten of Trumps do the same.

If a player holds the King of Trumps and Queen of Trumps, apart from the stakes on these two pools he also receives the stake for their 'marriage'.

The stake on the Sequence pool goes to the player who has the best run of three cards, a higher run beating a lower and a trump sequence beating one in a plain suit. In the event of two equal-ranking, plain suit sequences, positional priority applies i.e. the player earlier in the order of play wins.

If a pool is not cleared in the course of melding, the stakes remain on the pool and are valid for the next stage. Before the next stage, however, new stakes are added.

Stage Two: Pochen 
The next stage is Pochen, a bidding or vying round which resembles a very simple poker game.

The dealer asks "Who's knocking?" (Wer pocht?) Beginning with forehand, the first player with has a 'set' (Kunststück), i.e. two or more cards of the same rank, may say "I'll knock!" (Ich poche!) and place a number of chips in the Pinke in the middle of the board. Or he may name his stake by saying e.g. "I'll knock one!" (Ich poche eins!) and staking one chip or "I'll knock three!" and staking three chips. Any player who thinks he can beat the 'knocker' (Pocher) with a better set says "I'll hold it!" (Ich halte es!) or just "I'll hold!" (Ich halte!) and places the same number of chips in the pool as the knocker did.  Alternatively a player may take over as the knocker by saying "I'll knock higher!" (Ich poche nach!), "I'll raise!" or "I'll knock two!" (Ich poche zwei!), thus raising the stake. However, if he has a hand that he thinks has little chance of winning, he may opt to "pass" and drop out of this stage of the game, losing any stake he has placed. Then the other players take turns to do the same just like the betting rounds of poker. Bidding continues until no-one wishes to raise further.

If at least two players are left in (the knocker and one or more who 'held'), they reveal their sets and the highest wins both the contents of the Poch pool and the stakes placed in the Pinke in the middle. Sets must be either four of a kind (Gevierte), three of a kind (Gedritte) or pairs (Paare). Any four of a kind beats any three of a kind and any three of a kind beats a pair. If the sets are of the same type, the higher ranking set wins; if two players have sets of the same rank, the player who has the trump card wins. If all but one player pass, the knocker wins and does not need to show his hand. Thus bluffing is possible.

Stage Three: Shedding 
The last stage of the game is the 'playing out' (Ausspielen) or shedding phase. Two different ways of doing this are described in the various rules.

Domino variant 
Pierer (1844) describes a domino-like variant where the first player (presumably forehand) plays any card, but typically the lowest card of his longest suit. The player with the next higher card in the same suit (which could be the same player), places it on the card played, etc. until the run ends because it is either completed with the Ace or the next higher card is in the talon. The player who played the last card may now start a new run with any card from his hand. The game continues in this way until a player can discard his last card. This player now receives as many chips from each player as they each have cards in their hand.

Trick-taking variant 
According to Von Alvensleben (1853), this stage involves trick-taking rather than building sequences. Forehand leads by playing any card and players must follow suit if they can or pass (thus playing no card at all) if unable. The winner of a trick leads to the next. Trumps appear to play no part. Again, the first player to shed all his cards wins as many chips per player as they have cards remaining. When the winner plays his last card, the others may not get rid of a remaining hand card, even if they can follow suit.

Additional rules 
According to Meyer, no chips are deposited into the pool marked Poch in the middle at the beginning of the game. Sequence is generally defined as a sequence of at least three consecutive cards of a suit, e.g.  J -  10 -  9. Sometimes it is also played in such a way that the player who has the highest ranking sequence (according to Meyer) may collect the stakes from the Sequence pool. Here, a longer sequence beats a shorter sequence, a higher sequence beats a lower sequence, if both sequences are of equal length and ran, Trumps beat the other suit; if that does not make a difference, then the player closer to the left of the dealer wins.

Footnotes

References

Literature

External links 

 www.pochen.de

French deck card games
German deck card games
German card games
Gambling games
Stops group
Compendium games
Vying games
15th-century card games